Jones Point is a point within Wilhelmina Bay, lying  west of Pelseneer Island and  southeast of Cape Anna on the west coast of Graham Land, Antarctica. It was charted by the Belgian Antarctic Expedition under Gerlache, 1897–99, and was named by the UK Antarctic Place-Names Committee in 1960 for Sir Bennett M. Jones, FRS, author of Aerial Surveying by Rapid Methods, a pioneer work on the subject.

References

Headlands of Graham Land
Danco Coast